The Kartvelian languages (also known as South Caucasian,  Kartvelic, and Iberian languages) are a language family indigenous to the South Caucasus and spoken primarily in Georgia. There are approximately 5.2 million Kartvelian speakers worldwide, with large groups in Russia, Iran, the United States, the European Union, Israel, and northeastern Turkey. The Kartvelian family has no known relation to any other language family, making it one of the world's primary language families.

The most widely spoken of these languages is Georgian. The earliest literary source in any Kartvelian language is the Old Georgian Bir el Qutt inscriptions, written in ancient Georgian Asomtavruli script at the once-existing Georgian monastery near Bethlehem, dated to c. 430 AD. Georgian scripts are used to write all Kartvelian languages.

Social and cultural status
Georgian is the official language of Georgia (spoken by 90% of the population) and the main language for literary and business use in Georgia. It is written with an original and distinctive alphabet, and the oldest surviving literary text dates from the 5th century AD. The old Georgian script seems to have been derived from the Greek script, but this is not certain.

Mingrelian has been written with the Georgian alphabet since 1864, especially in the period from 1930 to 1938, when the Mingrelians enjoyed some cultural autonomy, and after 1989.

The Laz language was written mainly between 1927 and 1937, and now again in Turkey using the Latin alphabet. Laz, however, is disappearing as its speakers are integrating into mainstream Turkish society.

Classification

The Kartvelian language family consists of four closely related languages:

 Svan (ლუშნუ ნინ, lušnu nin), with approximately 35,000–40,000 native speakers in Georgia, mainly in the northwestern mountainous region of Svaneti and the Kodori Gorge in Abkhazia
 Georgian-Zan (also called Karto-Zan)
 Georgian (ქართული ენა, kartuli ena) with approximately 4 million native speakers, mainly in Georgia. There are Georgian-speaking communities in Russia, Turkey, Iran, Israel, and EU countries, but the current number and distribution of them are unknown.
 Judaeo-Georgian (ყივრული ენა, kivruli ena) with some 85,000 speakers, is the only Kartvelian Jewish dialect, its status being the subject of debate among scholars.
 Zan (also called Colchian)
 Mingrelian (მარგალური ნინა, margaluri nina), with some 500,000 native speakers in 1989, mainly in the western regions of Georgia, namely Samegrelo and Abkhazia (at present in Gali district only). The number of Mingrelian speakers in Abkhazia was very strongly affected by the war with Georgia in the 1990s which resulted in the expulsion and flight of the ethnic Georgian population, the majority of which were Mingrelians. Nevertheless, Georgians in Abkhazia (mostly Mingrelians) make up 18% of the population, in Gali district 98.2%. The Mingrelians displaced from Abkhazia are scattered elsewhere in the Georgian government territory, with dense clusters in Tbilisi and Zugdidi.
 Laz (ლაზური ნენა, lazuri nena), with 22,000 native speakers in 1980, mostly in the Black Sea littoral area of northeast Turkey, and with some 2,000 in Adjara, Georgia.

Genealogical tree

The connection between these languages was first reported in linguistic literature by Johann Anton Güldenstädt in his 1773 classification of the languages of the Caucasus, and later proven by G. Rosen, Marie-Félicité Brosset, Franz Bopp and others during the 1840s. Zan is the branch that contains the Mingrelian and Laz languages.

On the basis of glottochronological analysis, Georgi Klimov dates the split of the Proto-Kartvelian into Svan and Proto-Georgian-Zan (Proto-Karto-Zan) to the 19th century BC, and the further division into Georgian and Zan to the 8th century BC, although with the reservation that such dating is very preliminary and substantial further study is required.

Higher-level connections
No relationship with other languages, including Northwest Caucasian and/or Northeast Caucasian, has been demonstrated so far. According to the Nostratic hypothesis, advocated by Illič-Svityč and his
school, the six language families Altaic, Uralic, Indo-European, Dravidian,
Semito-Hamitic and Kartvelian go back to a common proto-language and are thus genetically related. Note however that both the concept of a Nostratic family and Kartvelian's relation to it are not considered likely by other linguists. Furthermore, recent studies in Nostratic etymology suggest that the lexicostatistical matches between Proto-Kartvelian and nuclear Nostratic families are so few that they seem to be rather chance coincidences.

Certain grammatical similarities with Basque, especially in the case system, have often been pointed out. However, the hypothesis of a relationship, which also tends to link the Caucasian languages with other non-Indo-European and non-Semitic languages of the Near East of ancient times, is generally considered to lack conclusive evidence. Any similarities to other linguistic phyla may be due to areal influences. Heavy borrowing in both directions (i.e. from North Caucasian to Kartvelian and vice versa) has been observed; therefore, it is likely that certain grammatical features have been influenced as well. If the Dené–Caucasian hypothesis, which attempts to link Basque, Burushaski, the North Caucasian families and other phyla, is correct, then the similarities to Basque may also be due to these influences, however indirect. Certain Kartvelian–Indo-European lexical links are revealed at the protolanguage level, which are ascribed to the early contacts between Proto-Kartvelian and Proto-Indo-European populations.

Phonetics and phonology

Regular correspondences

Grammar

Noun classification
The Kartvelian languages have grammatical gender based on animacy, classifying objects as intelligent ("who"-class) and unintelligent ("what"-class) beings.

Declension

Verb
Kartvelian verbs can indicate one, two, or three grammatical persons. A performer of an action is called the subject and affected persons are objects (direct or indirect). The person may be singular or plural. According to the number of persons, the verbs are classified as unipersonal, bipersonal or tripersonal.

Unipersonal verbs have only a subject and so are always intransitive.
Bipersonal verbs have a subject and one object, which can be direct or indirect. The verb is:
transitive when the object is direct;
intransitive if the object is indirect.
Tripersonal verbs have one subject and both direct and indirect objects and are ditransitive.

Subjects and objects are indicated with special affixes.

By means of special markers Kartvelian verbs can indicate four kinds of action intentionality ("version"):
subjective—shows that the action is intended for oneself,
objective—the action is intended for another person,
objective-passive—the action is intended for another person and at the same time indicating the passiveness of subject,
neutral—neutral with respect to intention.

Case patterns
Subject, direct object and indirect object are coded by the three core-cases, namely ergative, nominative and dative. Although the term "ergative" is traditional, strictly speaking no Kartvelian language features ergative alignment. Rather, they display a mixture of nominative-accusative and active alignment, depending on two factors:

the class to which the verb belongs, based on its morphological and syntactic properties (class 1 including all transitive verbs, while intransitive verbs are divided between class 2 and 3);
the series to which the tense/aspect/mood form (traditionally known as screeve) belongs.

Georgian and Svan have accusative alignment in the Present series (often termed Series I) and active alignment in the Aorist series (Series II).

Laz has extended the case marking of Series II to Series I, thus featuring active alignment regardless of tense.

Mingrelian, on the other hand, has extended the use of the ergative to all intransitive verbs, becoming fully accusative in all series, although with different case marking.

Examples from inherited lexicon

See also
 Proto-Kartvelian language

Citations

General references 
 
 
 Boeder, W. (2005). "The South Caucasian languages", Lingua, vol. 115, iss. 1–2 (Jan.-Feb.), pp. 5–89
 
 
 
 
 
 Gamkrelidze, Th. (Jan.–Mar. 1966) "A Typology of Common Kartvelian", Language, vol. 42, no. 1, pp. 69–83

External links
 Lazuri Nena – The Language of the Laz by Silvia Kutscher.
 Kartvelian Languages Department of the Arnold Chikobava Institute of Linguistics, Georgian Academy of Sciences
 Arthur Holmer, The Iberian-Caucasian Connection in a Typological Perspective

 The rise and fall and revival of the Ibero-Caucasian hypothesis by Kevin Tuite (Université de Montréal).

 
Language families